FAV may refer to:
 Film-animation-video, a combination of film studies disciplines
 An alternate spelling of "fave," short for favourite
 Fabrikarbeiterverband, a defunct German trade union
 Fakarava Airport, in French Polynesia
 Fast Attack Vehicle
 Fav peninsula, in Iraq
 Faversham railway station, in England
 Andorran Sailing Federation
 Venezuelan Air Force